Lee Collins may refer to:

Lee Collins (footballer, born 1974), Scottish former footballer
Lee Collins (footballer, born 1977), English former footballer
Lee Collins (footballer, born 1988) (1988–2021), English footballer
Lee Collins (musician) (1901–1960), American jazz musician
Lee Collins (Unicode), software engineer, co-creator of Unicode

See also
Justin Lee Collins, British comedian